Phyllonorycter acutulus is a moth of the family Gracillariidae. It is found in Kenya in high altitude alpine meadows and low shrub zone in the eastern part of the Albertine Rift Mountains.

The length of the forewings is 3.56 mm. The forewing ground colour is ochreous with pale fuscous shading. The hindwings are pale fuscous. Adults are on wing in April.

Etymology
The specific epithet is derived from Latin acutus (meaning sharpen) and refers to the sharp, ridge-like signum on the corpus bursae.

References

Endemic moths of Kenya
Moths described in 2012
acutulus
Moths of Africa

Taxa named by Jurate de Prins